Socrates Sculpture Park is an outdoor museum and public park where artists can create and exhibit sculptures and multi-media installations. It is located one block from the Noguchi Museum at the intersection of Broadway and Vernon Boulevard in the neighborhood of Astoria, Queens, New York City. In addition to exhibition space, the park offers an arts education program, artist residency program, and job training.

History and description

Socrates Sculpture Park is located atop the mouth of the buried Sunswick Creek. In 1986, American sculptor Mark di Suvero created Socrates Sculpture Park on an abandoned landfill and illegal dumpsite in Long Island City. The four-acre site is the largest outdoor space in New York City dedicated to exhibiting sculpture. The former landfill was renovated into the current park by a team of contemporary artists and local youths. The park operated for 14 years with only a temporary city park status. In 1998, the park was given official status by then New York City mayor Rudolph Giuliani as a permanent city park after a developer attempted to erect luxury apartments and a marina on the site after the park's lease had expired.

In 2005, the park was among 406 New York City arts and social service institutions to receive part of a $20 million grant from the Carnegie Corporation, which was made possible through a donation by New York City mayor Michael Bloomberg.

At the Socrates Sculpture Park's main entrance hangs a 10-by-28-foot billboard structure that has been an ongoing installation since 1999. The original billboard was a mirror image of the street created by artist Mathieu Borysevicz built by ongoing volunteer Ross H. Radtke, a mechanical engineer and neighbour.

New billboards are installed once or twice per year. Artists work with printmaking and photography to create an image that greets visitors as they enter the park, and sets the tone for the current show. The billboards are in conjunction with each spring exhibition.
The park has numerous workshops and public programming. Many artists lead tour programs of current exhibitions, there are summer art projects, and various free public events, such as yoga and capoeira on Saturdays and outdoor movie screenings on Wednesdays that begin in mid July and end in mid August. GrowNYC runs an Astoria Farmer's Market in the park every Saturday during the summer months.

In January 2019, the Park announced its plan to construct and install permanent staff offices made out of shipping containers. This would be the parks first permanent on-site structure.

Artists who have exhibited at Socrates Sculpture Park
Socrates Sculpture Park offers emerging and established artists an opportunity to make a temporary or permanent public sculpture in a New York City park. In 2018, Virginia Overton became the first female artist to have a solo exhibition at the Socrates Sculpture Park.
Vito Acconci 1986
Maren Hassinger 1988, 2022
Merle Temkin 1991
Sanford Biggers 2001
Agnes Denes 2015

Governance

The current executive director of the park is John Hatfield, former deputy director of the New Museum of Contemporary Art. Some former executive directors of the park include Alyson Baker (2000–2011), Kathleen Gilrain (1995–2000), and Eve Sussman (1993- ).

Board of directors 
 Mark di Suvero, chair emeritus
 Stuart Match Suna, president
 Robert F. Goldrich, vice president
 Ivana Mestrovic, secretary and treasurer
 Joel Shapiro
 Maxine Frankel
 Richard Gluckman, FAIA
 Hugh Hardy, FAIA
 Brooke Kamin Rapaport
 Ursula von Rydingsvard
 Deidrea Miller
 Shaun LeonardoShaun Leonardo
 Alison Saar
 Kimberly Strong
 Martin Silver, Ex Officio

See also
Landfill in the United States

References

External links

Illustrated article on Socrates Sculpture Park

Parks in Queens, New York
Sculpture gardens, trails and parks in New York (state)
Former landfills in the United States
1986 establishments in New York City
Museums in Queens, New York
Art museums and galleries in New York City
Art museums established in 1986
Astoria, Queens
Long Island City